Glenea illuminata is a species of beetle in the family Cerambycidae. It was described by James Thomson in 1857. It is known from Singapore.

References

illuminata
Beetles described in 1857